John Dudley Groves (12 August 1922 – 26 December 2007) was a British former journalist and civil servant who served as Downing Street Press Secretary under Alec Douglas-Home from 1963 to 1964.

Early life 
The youngest son of Walter Groves, founding editor of The Motor magazine, John Groves was educated at St Paul's school and would follow in his father's footsteps into journalism, joining the Richmond Herald as a reporter during the Blitz. He subsequently enlisted in the army to fight in World War II as member of the Reconnaissance regiment.

Career 
After demobilisation Groves returned to journalism and was a member of the Press Association parliamentary staff. He subsequently worked as deputy lobby correspondent for the Times newspaper from 1951 before leaving in 1958 to head up the press office at the Treasury.

After two years, in 1960, Groves was promoted to deputy press secretary to Harold Macmillan and was in the post during the time of the Profumo scandal. He then succeeded Sir Harold Evans to become press secretary to Sir Alec Douglas-Home when the latter became prime minister in October 1963. He vacated the post with the defeat of the Alec Douglas-Home at the October 1964 general election.

In later life he served as chief press officer at the Ministry of Defence, the director general of the Central Office of Information and head of the Government Information Service. John Groves was awarded an OBE in the 1964 Prime Minister's Resignation Honours and Companion of the Bath in the 1981 Queen's Birthday Honours. He retired in 1982 and was a founder of the Pewsey Vale Railway Society.

Personal life 
Groves was married in 1943 to Pamela Holliday until her death in May 2007. The union bore two daughters and a son.

References 

1922 births
2007 deaths
Companions of the Order of the Bath
Officers of the Order of the British Empire
People educated at St Paul's School, London
Reconnaissance Corps soldiers
British male journalists
20th-century British journalists
British Army personnel of World War II